WRCP may refer to:

 Wild Resource Conservation Program, a biodiversity conservation program in Pennsylvania, United States
 WNWR, a radio station (1540 AM) licensed to Philadelphia, Pennsylvania, United States, which held the call sign WRCP from 1967 to 1985
 WRFF, a radio station (104.5 FM) licensed to Philadelphia, Pennsylvania, United States, which held the call sign WRCP-FM from 1965 to 1977 
 WPVD (AM), a radio station (1290 AM) licensed to Providence, Rhode Island, United States, which held the call sign WRCP from 1985 to 1998
 WZPH-LP, a radio station (96.7 FM) licensed to Dade City, Florida, United States, which held the call sign WRCP-LP from 2002 to 2003